Whittier is a city at the head of the Passage Canal in the U.S. state of Alaska, about  southeast of Anchorage. The city is within the Chugach Census Area, one of the two entities established in 2019 when the former Valdez–Cordova Census Area was dissolved. It is also a port for the Alaska Marine Highway. The population was 272 at the 2020 census, having increased from 220 in 2010. The city is notable for the fact that almost all of its residents live in the Begich Towers Condominium, earning it the nickname of a "town under one roof".

History

The region occupied by Whittier was once part of the portage route of the Chugach people native to Prince William Sound. Later, the passage was used by Russian and American explorers, and by prospecting miners during the Klondike Gold Rush. The nearby Whittier Glacier was named for American poet John Greenleaf Whittier in 1915, and the town eventually took the name as well.

During World War II, the United States Army constructed a military facility, complete with port and railroad, near Whittier Glacier and named the facility Camp Sullivan. The spur of the Alaska Railroad to Camp Sullivan was completed in 1943, and the port became the entrance for United States soldiers into Alaska.

The two buildings that dominate the town were built after World War II. The 14-story Hodge Building (renamed Begich Towers) was completed in 1957 and contains 150 two-and-three-bedroom apartments plus bachelor efficiency units. Dependent families and Civil Service employees were moved into this high-rise. The Whittier School was connected by a tunnel at the base of the west tower so students could safely access school on days with bad weather. The building was named in honor of Colonel Walter William Hodge, who was a civil engineer and the commanding officer of 93rd Engineer Regiment on the Alcan Highway.

The other main structure in town, the Buckner Building, was completed in 1953, and was called the "city under one roof". The Buckner Building was eventually abandoned. Buckner and Begich Towers were at one time the largest buildings in Alaska. The Begich Towers building became a condominium, and along with the two-story private residence known as Whittier Manor, houses a majority of the town's residents.

The port at Whittier was an active Army facility until 1960.

On March 27, 1964, Whittier suffered over $10 million worth of damage in what became known as the Good Friday earthquake. As of 2022, the earthquake remains the largest U.S. earthquake, measuring 9.2 on the moment magnitude scale, and having caused tsunamis along the West Coast of the U.S. The tsunami that hit Whittier reached a height of 13 m (43 ft) and killed 13 people.

Whittier was incorporated in 1969 and eventually became a port of call for cruise ships. It is utilized by local operations and about 100-passenger mid-sized cruise ships. When the Anton Anderson Memorial Tunnel opened to public access in 2000, it became the first highway to connect Whittier to Anchorage and inner Alaska—previously, the only ways to reach the town had been rail, boat and plane.

After the tunnel expanded access to Whittier, it began to be visited by larger cruise lines. It is the embarkation/debarkation point of one-way cruises from Anchorage to Vancouver by Princess Tours. Whittier is also popular with tourists, photographers, outdoor enthusiasts, paddlers, hikers, sport fishermen, and hunters because of its abundance of wildlife and natural beauty. Whittier is located within the Chugach National Forest, the second-largest national forest in the U.S.

Whittier is in the Chugach School District and has one school serving approximately 48 students from preschool through high school, according to the 2019–2020 enrollment numbers.

Geography
The only land access is through the Anton Anderson Memorial Tunnel, a mixed-use road and rail tunnel. The town is on the northeast shore of the Kenai Peninsula, at the head of Passage Canal, on the west side of Prince William Sound.

Climate
It is the wettest city in Alaska and the United States, receiving significantly more annual precipitation than Yakutat and Ketchikan which are the second- and third-wettest cities in Alaska, respectively. Whittier is located at the northern tip of the world's northernmost temperate rainforest, the Tongass.

Demographics

Whittier first appeared on the 1950 U.S. Census as an unincorporated village. It formally incorporated in 1969.

As of 2018, there were 205 people living in the city, with 313 available housing units. Almost the entirety of this population lives within the 14-story Begich Towers. The racial makeup of the city was 68.3% White, 10.6% Asian, 6.9% Hispanic, 5.7% Native American.

There are 124 households in the town and the average household size is roughly 1.79 people, according to 2014 statistics. Of these households, 56 are families and 68 are non-families. 40.30% of the population is married, and 32.34% are divorced. 51.78% of the population has children.

The age distribution within the city shows that 13.96 percent of the population is under the age of 18, 3.15 percent is between the ages of 18 and 24, 23.87 percent is between the ages of 25 to 44, 52.25 percent is between the ages of 45 and 64, and 6.76 percent of the population is above the age of 65.

The median income for a household in the city was $45,000 in 2019. The per capita income for the city was $29,106.  Unemployment in Whittier was at a rate of 8.0 percent.

Government
City government consists of a seven-member council with a mayor and six council members.

The small city has three key departments: administration, public safety, and public works.

Services
Whittier Police Department is the main police force in the community. The department was founded in 1974 by Chief of Police Gordon Whittier and two officers, and retains the same level of permanent staff today, although in summer, temporary officers are hired when the town has many tourists.  The office is in a one-room unit located on the first floor of the Begich Towers. The station has no place to hold or interrogate people.

Whittier Fire Department is a volunteer fire and rescue service with mutual aid from neighboring departments.

Transportation

Harbor
There is a harbor and a deep-water port used by cruise ships and the Alaska Marine Highway.

Airfield and seaplane dock
There are no other facilities, and the runway is not maintained in winter. For the 12-month period ending December 31, 2005, the airport had 700 aircraft operations, an average of 58 per month: 97 percent general aviation and 3 percent air taxi. At that time there were two single-engine aircraft based at this airport. The runway was  longer but was damaged by the 1964 Good Friday earthquake.

The city also operates a seaplane dock.

Tunnel

Known by locals as the Whittier tunnel or the Portage tunnel, the Anton Anderson Memorial Tunnel is a tunnel through Maynard Mountain. It links the Seward Highway south of Anchorage with Whittier and is the only land access to the town.

Alaska Rail connection
Whittier is Alaska Rail ARRC's connection to the rail systems in Canada and the lower 48 states (by way of rail barge).

References

External links

 City of Whittier
 Whittier Chamber of Commerce

Cities in Alaska
Cities in Chugach Census Area, Alaska
Kenai Mountains-Turnagain Arm National Heritage Area
Populated coastal places in Alaska on the Pacific Ocean